The Illinois State Redbirds baseball team is the varsity intercollegiate athletic team of Illinois State University in Normal, IL. The team competes at the Division I level of the NCAA and is a member of the Missouri Valley Conference.

History
The program's first year of competition was 1890. Fifteen players that played for Illinois State have made it to the MLB level.

Stadium
Illinois State plays at Duffy Bass Field, a 1,000-seat (1,200, including non-seating areas) facility located in the northwest corner of the university's campus in Normal, IL. The facility is named for the school's winningest baseball coach in its history.

Head coaches

Records are through the end of the 2021 season

Redbirds in the Major Leagues

Taken from the 2020 Illinois State baseball media guide.

External links
 Official website

References